A floorwalker is a senior employee in a large store (usually a department store) who supervises sales staff, in addition to directing and assisting customers and resolving complaints and returns.  Until the early 20th century, when formal training came into vogue, the floorwalker would often be responsible for training new sales staff.

Cultural depiction 
 Charles Chaplin had his Tramp impersonate one in The Floorwalker.
 "Captain" Stephen Peacock is a regular character with that position in the British television situation comedy, Are You Being Served?.

References 

Sales occupations